Writer Fredric M. Frank (July 9, 1911 New York City - May 9, 1977 Los Angeles, California) was a favourite scribe of Cecil B. deMille and worked with him on several of his epic productions throughout the 1940s and 1950s including Unconquered, Samson and Delilah, The Greatest Show on Earth for which he won an Academy Award for Best Story, and The Ten Commandments.

His last film was El Cid in 1961.

External links
 

1911 births
1977 deaths
American male screenwriters
Best Story Academy Award winners
20th-century American male writers
20th-century American screenwriters